Luca Bertossio (born January 24, 1990) is an Italian aerobatics pilot performing glider aerobatics as competitor for the Italian National Glider Aerobatic Team and as a professional Airshow pilot and Flight Instructor.

Bertossio is the first Italian to won 9 FAI Gold medals, 8 Silver and 4 Bronze FAI medals for the glider aerobatics discipline, and the titles of Advanced Vice-World Champion 2011 and Advanced World Champion of Glider’s Aerobatics in the 2012 WAGAC competition championship, World Air Games Champion 2015, Vice-World Games Champion 2017 and 3 Times Vice-World Overall Unlimited Champion 2015, 2018 and 2021.
Bertossio's flight activity is based mainly at the National Italian Glider’s Aerobatic Centers of Ozzano nell'Emilia (BO) and in the past as an instructor at the International Glider Aerobatic Academy in Williams, CA (USA).

In the Italian aerobatics history Bertossio reached the best ever placement in the Unlimited category of the WGAC World Championship.
He became Vice-World Champion 2015,2018 and 2021.
He is the youngest ever World Air Games Champion 2015-Dubai.

In 2017, Bertossio also ranked second at The World Games.

Pilot's experiences 
EASA CPL-IR(A) ME,SE
EASA ATPL(A) Theory
Qualifications: PBN, A-UPRT, MCC/JOC
Endorsements: TMG, NR,TW,RU,VP,G1000,Traino Alianti
EASA SPL FI
Certified Unlimited Aerobatic Flight Instructor
FAA CPL GL
Statement of Acrobatic Competency by Sean D.Tucker[8]

Sport Experiences and Achievements 
2nd level Sport glider aerobatics course with Pietro Filippini 2010
3rd level Intermediate glider aerobatics course with Pietro Filippini 2010
4th level Advanced glider aerobatics course with Pietro Filippini and Sandor Katona 2011
5th level Unlimited glider aerobatics course with Pietro Filippini and Sandor Katona 2011
Glider aerobatics Airshow pilot course with Pietro Filippini 2011
Glider aerobatics activity Coordinator and Instructor at National Glider Aerobatics Center of Udine
Coach at Romanian National Glider Aerobatics Team 2013
Organization, promotion, communication, sponsorships management and sport logistics for Fly&Joy a.s.d and Volo Club Udine a.s.d
Aeronautics personality of the year award 2013 
Winner of "Brera" Sport award 2014
"Premio all'Avvenire" award from Olympics Athletes Association
Honor Bronze Medal for Sport Achievements 2011
Official Aerobatic Pilot and Testimonial of CITIZEN Watches co. ltd 2013-2015
Official Aerobatic Pilot and creator of the Project Sparco AERO

Sport results 

1st Place and Italian Glider Aerobatics Champion 2010 in Promotion and Sport categories after having obtained the license just a month before the competition
Entered the Italian National Glider Aerobatics Team in 2011
2nd Place and Silver FAI Medal at Unlimited absolut championships in 2011 onboard of a Swift S-1 with around just 35 flights on this glider
1st Place and Italian Glider Aerobatics Champion 2011 in the Advanced category on board a Swift S-1 
2nd Place Silver Medal at the 1st Italian Freestyle's Trophy 2011
2nd Place and FAI Silver Medal for the Known program of the WAGAC 2012 World Championship in Poland (first time in the history for an Italian pilot)
2nd Place as Vice World Champion at WAGAC 2011 in Poland (first time in the history for an Italian pilot)
Received 7 FAI Diplomas from the International CIVA Glider Aerobatics Commission
Recognized and awarded by the 'Aeroclub d'Italia' Italian's flying clubs association on the occasion of its centenary in the beautiful setting of the Circus Maximus in Rome
Italian champion in glider aerobatics in 2011 in the Intermediate category aboard Swift S-1
Silver Medal for the Club Class in the Italian Championship aboard Swift S-1
Entered the Italian National Glider Aerobatics Team in 2012
Gold Medal in the first Freestyle competition of the 2012 season
1st Place as Italian champion in glider aerobatics in 2012 in the Advanced category aboard Swift S-1
2nd Place and Silver medal at the championships Absolute Unlimited 2012 aboard Swift S-1
1st Place FAI Gold Medal in the Known program WAGAC 2012
1st Place FAI Gold Medal in the Unknown programs WAGAC 2012
1st Place FAI Gold Medal for the result in Teams (Blue Team ITALY)
1st Place FAI Gold Medal Overall and World Champion WAGAC 2012
1st Place Winner Freestyle Sassuolo (MO), Italy
1st Place Freestyle Gold Medal in 2013 in Rome
1st Place First Place at Advanced category Italian Championship 2013
2nd Place Silver Medal in the Club class Italian Championship 2013
1st Place Freestyle Gold Medal 2013 in Lucca, Italy
2nd Place at the International Swiss Glider Aerobatic Championship 2014
7th Place at World Glider Aerobatic Championship 2014
3rd Place Overall International Danubia Cup 2015
3rd Place FAI Bronze Medalist for the Known Compulsory Program WGAC 2015
2nd Place FAI Silver Medalist for the Unknown Programs WGAC 2015
2nd Place FAI Silver Medalis and Vice-World Champion WGAC 2015 (Best Placement for an Italian Pilot ever) 
1st Place FAI Gold Medal G1 Free Program World Air Games 2015 Dubai
3rd Place FAI Bronze Medal G2 Unknown Program World Air Games 2015 Dubai
3rd Place FAI Bronze Medal G3 Freestyle Program World Air Games 2015 Dubai
1st Place FAI OVERALL World Air Games Champion 2015 Dubai 
1st Place Milano Freestyle Trophy 2016
1st Place Italian Unlimited Glider Aerobatic Championship 2016
2nd Place at The World Games 2017 in Wroclaw, Poland
1st Place National Glider Aerobatic Championship
1st Place Freestyle Championship - Milano
1st Place Unknowns Programs WGAC
2nd Place Overall World Championship 2018
1st Place FreeKnown Program World Glider Aerobatic Championship 2021
1st Place Unknown Programs World Glider Aerobatic Championship 2021
2nd Place Overall World Glider Aerobatic Championship 2021

See also

Aerobatics
Glider

References

Aerobatic pilots
Italian aviators
Glider pilots
1990 births
Living people